Alfred von Domaszewski (October 30, 1856 – March 25, 1927) was an Austrian historian born in Timișoara in the Habsburg monarchy.

He received his education in Vienna, and following graduation remained in Vienna as a secondary school teacher. In 1884 he began work as an assistant at the Kunsthistorisches Museum in Vienna. In 1887 he became an associate professor of ancient history at the University of Heidelberg, where in 1890 he attained full professorship. One of his better known students was historian Ernst Hartwig Kantorowicz (1895-1963).

In 1882 he accompanied German archaeologist Carl Humann (1839–1896) to Smyrna on behalf of the Berlin Academy of Sciences, with support from the Vienna Ministry of Education. He also assisted Humann on a reconstruction project involving the Monumentum Ancyranum. With philologist Rudolf Ernst Brünnow (1858–1917), he provided a comprehensive analysis and map of the ancient city of Petra.

Selected publications 
 Die Religion des römischen Heeres (The religion of the Roman Army), 1895.
 Die Rangordnung des römischen Heeres (The hierarchy of the Roman Army), 1907.
 Geschichte der römischen Kaiser (History of the Roman Emperor), 1909.
 Abhandlungen zur römischen Religion (Treatises on the Roman religion), 1909.

References 
 "This article is based on translations of equivalent articles at the Dutch and German Wikipedia", whose sources include a biography @  Österreichisches Biographisches Lexikon 1815–1950 (ÖBL). Band 1. Verlag der Österreichischen Akademie der Wissenschaften, Wien 1957, S. 193.

External links 
 Deutsche Wikisource extensive bibliography.

1856 births
1927 deaths
20th-century Austrian historians
Writers from Timișoara
Academic staff of Heidelberg University
19th-century Austrian historians